This is a list of Scottish women Twenty20 International cricketers. A Twenty20 International is an international cricket match between two representative teams. A Twenty20 International is played under the rules of Twenty20 cricket. In April 2018, the International Cricket Council (ICC) granted full international status to Twenty20 women's matches played between member sides from 1 July 2018 onwards. The Scotland women's team made their Twenty20 International debut on 7 July against Uganda in Amstelveen during the 2018 ICC Women's World Twenty20 Qualifier.

The list is arranged in the order in which each player won her first Twenty20 cap. Where more than one player won her first Twenty20 cap in the same match, those players are listed alphabetically by surname.

Key

Players
Statistics are correct as of 25 September 2022.

References

 
Scotland
Women Twenty